Cypraeovula edentulata, common name : the toothless cowrie, is a species of sea snail, a cowry, a marine gastropod mollusk in the family Cypraeidae, the cowries.

Description

Distribution
This marine species is distributed along Tanzania and the East Coast of South Africa.

References

 Verdcourt, B. (1959). The cowries of the East African Coast: Supplement II. JEANHS XXIII (100): 130–134

Cypraeidae
Gastropods described in 1825
Taxa named by John Edward Gray